Lateefa Buti (Arabic: لطيفة بطي) is a Kuwaiti writer. She has published many books for children including Hatless, which won the Sheikh Zayed Book Award in 2017 in the children's literature category, and was translated into English by Nancy Roberts.

Career 
Lateefa Buti has published two short story collections including The Mermaid and My Country, Ininkayo. In 2003, she started writing books for children. Buti has contributed stories to the Kuwaiti magazine Al Arabi Al Sagheer including Salem and Salma and My City Kuwait. Also, she has written some cultural heritage stories and folklore for Al Jazeera Children's Channel and Al Baraem Channel. Buti won several awards, including the first place award for Children's Theater Writing Competition at the level of the State of Kuwait, the second place in the Children's Theater Writing Competition at the level of the Arab world which was held by the National Council for Culture, Arts, and Literature in Kuwait in 2013, and won the Sheikh Zayed Book Award for category of Children's Literature for her book Hatless in 2017. She is the founder of Dar al-Ruslan for publishing which is the first Kuwaiti publishing house for children's book.

Works

Short story collections 
 My Country, Ininkayo (original title: Baladi Inenkaio), 2001
 The Mermaid (original title: Aroos Al-Bahr)

Plays 
 The Princess Salma (original title: al-Amira Salma)
 The Hunter Saleh  (original title: al-Sayad Saleh)

Children's book 
 Why Did the Young Foal Neighed? (original title: Limatha Sahalat Al Muhra Al Sageera?), 2010
 Miss Chicken (original title: Al Anesa Dajaja), 2016
 Khanfesa Tanesfna
 Nayel's Gloves
 Gregaan and the Kangaroo (original title: Greegaan wa al Kangar), 2017
 The Greyhound Puppy (original title: al-Garw sloogi), 2017
 Hatless (original title: Bela Qubaa), 2017
 Children and Rainbow Colors (original title: al-Atfal wa Qaous Qusah), 2017
 The Black Smile in the White City (original title: al-Ibtisama al-baidaa fi al-madina al-sawdaa), 2017

See also 

 Salha Obeid
 Nadia Al Najjar
 Hessa Al Muhairi
 Maryam Saqer Al Qasimi

References 

21st-century Kuwaiti writers
Year of birth missing (living people)
Living people
Kuwaiti women children's writers